So language may refer to
 So language (Democratic Republic of Congo), a Bantu language
 Sô language, a Katuic language (Mon-Khmer) of Laos and Thailand
 Swo language, a Bantu language of Cameroon
 Soo language, a Kuliak language of Uganda

See also
 So people (disambiguation)